Yegor Dugin (born November 4, 1990) is a Russian professional ice hockey centre who is currently an unrestricted free agent who most recently played for HC Kunlun Red Star in the Kontinental Hockey League (KHL).

Dugin made his KHL debut with Traktor Chelyabinsk in the 2009–10 season. After Dugin was traded to Dynamo during the 2013–14 season, he was signed to a three-year contract extension on April 17, 2014.

References

External links

1990 births
Living people
Admiral Vladivostok players
HC Dynamo Moscow players
HC Kunlun Red Star players
Russian ice hockey centres
HC Sibir Novosibirsk players
HC Sochi players
Torpedo Nizhny Novgorod players
Traktor Chelyabinsk players
HC Yugra players